Robert Jerome Serling (born Jerome Robert Serling; March 28, 1918 – May 6, 2010) was an American novelist and aviation writer.

Biography 
Born in Cortland, New York and raised in Binghamton, Serling graduated from Antioch College in 1942. He "deplored the name Jerome" and swapped his first and middle names as a young man. He was the older brother of screenwriter and The Twilight Zone creator Rod Serling. 

Serling became full-time aviation editor for United Press International in 1960. He wrote at least eight novels and sixteen books of nonfiction. His novel The President's Plane Is Missing was made into a 1973 made-for-TV film starring Buddy Ebsen. He received the 1988 Lauren D. Lyman Award "for distinguished achievement in the field of aviation and aerospace journalism."

He had two children with his second wife, Priscilla Arone.

Serling died of pancreatic cancer on May 6, 2010, at age 92 in Tucson, Arizona. He is buried beside his second wife, Priscilla Arone Serling, brother Rod Serling, and sister-in-law Carol Serling at Lake View Cemetery in Interlaken, New York.

Fiction

Non-fiction

Career

 Was a United Press International, Washington, DC, reporter and manager of Radio News Division, 1945–60, aviation editor, 1960–66; air safety lecturer and consultant, beginning 1966.
 Received numerous honors of his work throughout his career: Trans-World Airlines, seven awards, 1958–65, for aviation news reporting, Strebig-Dobben Memorial Award, 1960; special citations from Sherman Fairchild Foundation, 1963, Flight Safety Foundation, 1970, and Airline Pilots Association, 1970; Aviation/Space Writers Association, James Trebig Memorial Award, 1964, special citation, 1967, award in fiction, 1966, for The Left Seat, and in nonfiction, 1969, for Loud and Clear.
 Collected commercial airline models (more than four hundred during his life) and material on aviation research.
 Member of the Society of Air Safety Investigators and the Aviation/Space Writers Association
 Brother Rod Serling hired him as a technical consultant (for which he received on-screen credit) for the airplane sequences in the episode "The Odyssey of Flight 33" of his hit TV-show The Twilight Zone.  Robert Serling also received advisor or researcher credits on two other Rod Serling scripts: one each for scripts penned for Studio One and Playhouse 90.
 Something's Alive on the Titanic and The President's Plane Is Missing are fantasy novels set in real life high-profile backdrops.
 Was a reporter for the Washington Redskins. Travelled with the team and roomed with quarterback Eddie LeBaron.
 Authored the short story "Ghost Writer" published in Twilight Zone: 19 Original Stories on the 50th Anniversary.
 In 2008, was featured speaker at the 32nd annual Airliners International collectibles show and convention in Dallas, Texas.

References

External links
 
 

1918 births
2010 deaths
People from Cortland, New York
Antioch College alumni
American historians
Aviation historians
Aviation writers
American aviation writers
American aviation historians
20th-century American novelists
American male novelists
Jewish American novelists
20th-century American male writers
Novelists from New York (state)
20th-century American non-fiction writers
American male non-fiction writers
21st-century American Jews